Talne Raion was a raion (district) of Cherkasy Oblast, central Ukraine. Its administrative centre was located at the town of Talne. The raion was abolished on 18 July 2020 as part of the administrative reform of Ukraine, which reduced the number of raions of Cherkasy Oblast to four. The area of Talne Raion was merged into Zvenyhorodka Raion. The last estimate of the raion population was 

At the time of disestablishment, the raion consisted of one hromada, Talne urban hromada with the administration in Talne.

References

Former raions of Cherkasy Oblast
1923 establishments in Ukraine
Ukrainian raions abolished during the 2020 administrative reform